Robert John "Bob" Murdoch (born November 20, 1946) is a Canadian former professional ice hockey defenceman and coach. Murdoch played 12 seasons in the National Hockey League (NHL) for the Montreal Canadiens, Los Angeles Kings, Atlanta Flames and Calgary Flames and coached 10 seasons in the National Hockey League with the Calgary Flames, Chicago Blackhawks, Winnipeg Jets and San Jose Sharks. He won the Stanley Cup in 1971 and 1973 while with Montreal.

Coaching career
Murdoch coached 80 games with the Chicago Blackhawks during the 1987–88 season, compiling a record of 30–41–9, with a .413 win percentage. He was succeeded as Blackhawks coach by Mike Keenan the following season.

During the 1989–1990 season, Murdoch was named the head coach of the Winnipeg Jets. After missing the playoffs the previous season, the Jets went 37–32–11 for 85 points and 3rd in the Smythe Division, making the playoffs but losing to the eventual Stanley Cup Champion Edmonton Oilers in seven games. Murdoch was seen as an important part of the Jets quick turn around, winning the Jack Adams Award as the NHL's coach of the year.

Despite the success of the previous season, however, the Jets struggled in 1990–1991, finishing in the Smythe Division cellar at 26–43–11, and missing the playoffs completely. Murdoch was fired at season's end, being replaced by John Paddock.

Murdoch would become an associate coach for the San Jose Sharks during the 1991–1992 and 1992–1993 NHL seasons. Afterwards, he departed for Europe, and has since coached several teams in Germany's DEL.

Coaching record

Awards and achievements
1989–90 – Jack Adams Award winner
1974–75 – Played in NHL All-Star Game

International play
1968–69 – Member of Canadian National Team
1969–70 – Member of Canadian National Team

Career statistics

Regular season and playoffs

International

References

External links
 
 Hockey Le Magazine Profile

1946 births
Living people
Atlanta Flames players
Calgary Flames coaches
Calgary Flames players
Canadian ice hockey coaches
Canadian ice hockey defencemen
Chicago Blackhawks coaches
Ice hockey people from Ontario
Jack Adams Award winners
Los Angeles Kings players
Montreal Canadiens players
National Hockey League All-Stars
Sportspeople from Kirkland Lake
San Jose Sharks coaches
Stanley Cup champions
Undrafted National Hockey League players
Winnipeg Jets (1972–1996) coaches